Songs From Lonely Avenue is the eighth studio album from the American swing revival band The Brian Setzer Orchestra, released in 2009. This is the first album to feature all original songs written by Brian Setzer.

Track listing

 "Trouble Train"
 "Dead Man Incorporated"
 "Kiss Me Deadly"
 "Gimme Some Rhythm Daddy"
 "Lonely Avenue"
 "King of the Whole Damn World"
 "Mr. Jazzer Goes Surfin'"
 "Mr. Surfer Goes Jazzin'"
 "My Baby Don't Love Me Blues"
 "Love Partners in Crime"
 "Passion of the Night"
 "Dimes in the Jar"
 "Elena"

References

2009 albums
The Brian Setzer Orchestra albums
Albums produced by Dave Darling
Surfdog Records albums